Bill Williams (May 29, 1960 – May 28, 1998) was an American video game designer, programmer, composer, and author born with cystic fibrosis, an incurable genetic disorder. According to a medical encyclopedia Williams consulted when he was 12, people with cystic fibrosis weren't expected to live past the age of 13.

Williams created a string of computer games from 1982 through 1990 for the Atari 8-bit family and then the Amiga which are admired for their imaginative design concepts, innovative sound and music, and skillful implementation. Necromancer is a three-stage game about a wizard growing and controlling an army of trees. Scenarios in Alley Cat include stealthily drinking from the bowls of sleeping dogs, avoiding a sweeping broom to jump inside a fish bowl, and collecting ferns atop a bookcase protected by spiders. Mind Walker,  one of the first games released for the Amiga, places the player inside the head of a physics professor gone mad.

Late in his career he worked on a licensed title for the Nintendo Entertainment System and another for the Super NES, but became frustrated with the game business and left to attend the Lutheran School of Theology at Chicago and write two theological works.

Williams died from cystic fibrosis in 1998, at the age of 37.

Game design
Bill Williams's first published game was Salmon Run for the Atari 8-bit computers, published by the Atari Program Exchange in 1982. He then authored two titles for Synapse Software: Necromancer (1982)  and Alley Cat (1983). Alley Cat was begun by another programmer, John Harris, who abandoned the project. Synapse ported Salmon Run to the VIC-20, publishing it in 1983 under the label Showcase Software. In 1984, Synapse published the stress reduction package Relax, combining a sensor headband and mini-games providing biofeedback. The software was a collaboration between Williams and fellow Synapse game designer Kelly Jones (who wrote the 1983 Atari 8-bit game Drelbs).

He then moved to the Amiga, designing and programming Mind Walker (1986), Sinbad and the Throne of the Falcon (1987), and Pioneer Plague (1988).  Pioneer Plague was the first Amiga game to make full use of the difficult to work with Hold-And-Modify mode for the in-game graphics. His final game for the platform was Knights of the Crystallion (1990):

For almost all of these Atari 8-bit and Amiga titles, Williams did the design and programming, created the art and sound effects, and composed the music. The credits often read, simply, "by Bill Williams."

Near the end of his game development career he worked on Monopoly for the Nintendo Entertainment System and Bart's Nightmare for Super NES. Both games were for Sculptured Software in Salt Lake City, Utah, though Williams worked out of his home. Company meddling during the development of the last game prompted Williams to abandon the video game industry completely, calling the experience "Bill's Nightmare". Some Super Nintendo sound driver code written by Williams during this time was used in other games.

Writing
Williams wrote the book Naked Before God: The Return of a Broken Disciple, published by Morehouse Publishing in May 1998 and in paperback in 2001. It imagines himself as a disciple of Jesus with cystic fibrosis in the present day, trying to understand his struggles with CF and diabetes, and Jesus's message. A collection of poetry and short prose, Manna in the Wilderness: A Harvest of Hope, illustrated by his wife Martha Williams, was published posthumously in March 1999.

Death
Bill had been born with the genetic disorder cystic fibrosis, which affected his lungs and impaired his ability to breathe. In 1992, he moved to Chicago to study at the Lutheran School of Theology at Chicago, but the city's air pollution worsened his condition significantly, and he had to drop out after two years with only half of the program completed. He moved to Rockport, Texas, but his health continued to deteriorate until he died of complications from the disorder on May 28, 1998, one day before his 38th birthday.

References

External links
 Essay on Bill Williams's game development career which also explores Necromancer
 Bill Williams at MobyGames

1960 births
1998 deaths
20th-century American writers
20th-century American male writers
American video game designers
American video game programmers
Deaths from cystic fibrosis
Video game composers